The Royal Cape Golf Club in Cape Town, South Africa was established in 1885 and is the oldest golf club in Africa.

History
Royal Cape is South Africa's oldest and traditionally most prestigious course, set to the backdrop of Cape Town's Table Mountain and Devil's Peak.  The club began on the 14th of November 1885, established by Lt Gen Sir Henry D'Oyley Torrens only days after he arrived in the Cape Colony, soon to serve as acting Governor. A rough first 9-hole course was completed on Waterloo Green at the Wynberg Military Camp and presented the first monthly medal contest in 1886, won by the Torrens himself with a gross of 94.

The club was granted Royal status by King George V in 1910 in commemoration of the visit of the Duke of Connaught, who represented the king at the opening of the first Union of South Africa parliament.

Course 
The 6,121 meter course is a par 72 parklands style course built on relatively flat terrain, exposed to the Cape Doctor, the Cape's famous persistent and dry south-easterly wind that blows on the coast from spring to late summer (September to March).

Tournaments hosted
In addition to the Cape Town Open (since 2012) and the Cape Town Ladies Open (since 2015), the club has hosted a number of high-profile professional and amateur tournaments. In 1910, the club played host to the South African Open Championship for the first time and hosted the tournament ten times between 1910 and 1996. Past winners include Gary Player, Ernie Els, Mark McNulty and Trevor Immelman.

Professional

Amateur

See also
List of golf clubs granted Royal status
Timeline of golf history (1851–1945)

References

External links
 

Golf clubs and courses in South Africa
Sports venues in Cape Town
Royal golf clubs